James Doonan may refer to:

 James A. Doonan (1841–1911), American Jesuit priest
 James Doonan (trade unionist) (1868–1932), Scottish trade unionist

See also 

 Doonan (disambiguation), surname and placename page